The molar gas constant (also known as the gas constant, universal gas constant, or ideal gas constant) is denoted by the symbol  or . It is the molar equivalent to the Boltzmann constant, expressed in units of energy per temperature increment per amount of substance, i.e. the pressure–volume product, rather than energy per temperature increment per particle. The constant is also a combination of the constants from Boyle's law, Charles's law, Avogadro's law, and Gay-Lussac's law.  It is a physical constant that is featured in many fundamental equations in the physical  sciences, such as the ideal gas law, the Arrhenius equation, and the Nernst equation.

The gas constant is the constant of proportionality that relates the energy scale in physics to the temperature scale and the scale used for amount of substance.  Thus, the value of the gas constant ultimately derives from historical decisions and accidents in the setting of units of energy, temperature and amount of substance. The Boltzmann constant and the Avogadro constant were similarly determined, which separately relate energy to temperature and particle count to amount of substance.

The gas constant R is defined as the Avogadro constant NA multiplied by the Boltzmann constant k (or kB):

Since the 2019 redefinition of SI base units, both NA and k are defined with exact numerical values when expressed in SI units. As a consequence, the SI value of the molar gas constant is exactly .

Some have suggested that it might be appropriate to name the symbol R the Regnault constant in honour of the French chemist Henri Victor Regnault, whose accurate experimental data were used to calculate the early value of the constant. However, the origin of the letter R to represent the constant is elusive. The universal gas constant was apparently introduced independently by Clausius’ student, A.F. Horstmann (1873)
and Dmitri Mendeleev  who reported it first on Sep. 12, 1874.
Using his extensive measurements of the properties of gases,
Mendeleev also calculated it with high precision, within 0.3% of its modern value.

The gas constant occurs in the ideal gas law:

where P is the absolute pressure, V is the volume of gas, n is the amount of substance, m is the mass, and T is the thermodynamic temperature. Rspecific is the mass-specific gas constant. The gas constant is expressed in the same unit as are molar entropy and molar heat.

Dimensions
From the ideal gas law PV = nRT we get:

where P is pressure, V is volume, n is number of moles of a given substance, and T is temperature.

As pressure is defined as force per area of measurement, the gas equation can also be written as:

Area and volume are (length)2 and (length)3 respectively. Therefore:

Since force × length = work:

The physical significance of R is work per degree per mole. It may be expressed in any set of units representing work or energy (such as joules), units representing degrees of temperature on an absolute scale (such as kelvin or rankine), and any system of units designating a mole or a similar pure number that allows an equation of macroscopic mass and fundamental particle numbers in a system, such as an ideal gas (see Avogadro constant).

Instead of a mole the constant can be expressed by considering the normal cubic meter.

Otherwise, we can also say that:

Therefore, we can write R as:

And so, in terms of SI base units:

R = .

Relationship with the Boltzmann constant
The Boltzmann constant kB (alternatively k) may be used in place of the molar gas constant by working in pure particle count, N, rather than amount of substance, n, since

where NA is the Avogadro constant.
For example, the ideal gas law in terms of the Boltzmann constant is

where N is the number of particles (molecules in this case), or to generalize to an inhomogeneous system the local form holds:

where ρN = N/V is the number density.

Measurement and replacement with defined value 
As of 2006, the most precise measurement of R had been obtained by measuring the speed of sound ca(P, T) in argon at the temperature T of the triple point of water  at different pressures P, and extrapolating to the zero-pressure limit ca(0, T). The value of R is then obtained from the relation

where:
γ0 is the heat capacity ratio ( for monatomic gases such as argon);
T is the temperature, TTPW = 273.16 K by the definition of the kelvin at that time;
Ar(Ar) is the relative atomic mass of argon and Mu =  as defined at the time.

However, following the 2019 redefinition of the SI base units, R now has an exact value defined in terms of other exactly defined physical constants.

Specific gas constant

The specific gas constant of a gas or a mixture of gases (Rspecific) is given by the molar gas constant divided by the molar mass (M) of the gas or mixture.

Just as the molar gas constant can be related to the Boltzmann constant, so can the specific gas constant by dividing the Boltzmann constant by the molecular mass of the gas.

Another important relationship comes from thermodynamics. Mayer's relation relates the specific gas constant to the specific heat capacities for a calorically perfect gas and a thermally perfect gas.

where cp is the specific heat capacity for a constant pressure and cv is the specific heat capacity for a constant volume.

In any case, the context and/or unit of the gas constant should make it clear as to whether the universal or specific gas constant is being referred to. 

In case of air, using the perfect gas law and the standard sea-level conditions (SSL) (air density ρ0 = 1.225 kg/m3, temperature T0 = 288.15 K and pressure p0 = ), we have that Rair = P0/(ρ0T0) = . Then the molar mass of air is computed by M0 = R/Rair = .

U.S. Standard Atmosphere
The U.S. Standard Atmosphere, 1976 (USSA1976) defines the gas constant R∗ as:

R∗ =  = .

The USSA1976 acknowledges that this value is not consistent with the cited values for the Avogadro constant and the Boltzmann constant. This disparity is not a significant departure from accuracy, and USSA1976 uses this value of R∗ for all the calculations of the standard atmosphere. When using the ISO value of R, the calculated pressure increases by only 0.62 pascal at 11 kilometers (the equivalent of a difference of only 17.4 centimeters or 6.8 inches) and 0.292 Pa at 20 km (the equivalent of a difference of only 33.8 cm or 13.2 in).

Also note that this was well before the 2019 SI redefinition, through which the constant was given an exact value.

References

External links
 Ideal gas calculator  – Ideal gas calculator provides the correct information for the moles of gas involved.
 Individual Gas Constants and the Universal Gas Constant – Engineering Toolbox

Ideal gas
Physical constants
Amount of substance
Statistical mechanics
Thermodynamics